Gone is a 2007 psychological horror film starring Shaun Evans and Amelia Warner as a young British couple travelling through the Australian outback who become involved with a mysterious and charismatic American (Scott Mechlowicz) whose motive for imposing his friendship upon them becomes increasingly suspect.

Directed by Ringan Ledwidge in his directorial debut, the film was produced by Universal Pictures, Australian Film Finance Corporation (AFFC), StudioCanal, Working Title Films, and WT2 Productions.

Plot
Alex (Shaun Evans) arrives in Sydney. Realizing he has missed his bus, he is reading his travel guide on stone steps in the street, when Taylor (Scott Mechlowicz) suddenly sits near Alex and makes small talk with him, insisting that he come with him. After drinking and raucously horsing around with two unnamed girls, Alex awakens in a city park with Taylor standing over him with a Polaroid camera, snapping a photo of Alex with one of the girls they met that night. When driving out of town in Taylor's vehicle, Alex reveals that he is to be at Byron Bay to meet his girlfriend Sophie (Amelia Warner) and Taylor suggests that they travel together. When Alex and Taylor meet Sophie, she is with Ingrid (Zoe Tuckwell-Smith), a mate. The four of them head towards Katherine Gorge in the Northern Territory. The following day, about to leave, Taylor vaguely mentions that Ingrid had to meet someone and had caught a bus, with Alex and Sophie unbemused.

Following that, they move on and while driving hit a kangaroo with their car. This accident causes Alex to receive a major head wound. Sophie and Taylor get him supplies, but Alex refuses to cooperate, citing that they need to leave and get away from Taylor. When they end up at a hotel, Sophie goes to talk to Alex, but his room is empty and he texts her saying, "I'm going." Sophie tries to convince Taylor to go look for him, but they end up waiting the night.

The next day, they head toward the next town. Taylor says that they should pull over and rest. They spend the night together and in the morning Sophie attempts to text Alex. The phone in Taylor's pocket lights up. The next morning Sophie claims that Ingrid texted her to meet them at Katherine's Gorge. Taylor knows this is not true and begins chasing after Sophie. Sophie, in an attempt to get away, drives the car quickly away. Alex falls out of the boot inside of a sleeping bag, long dead. She continues to try getting away with Taylor after her in the boot of the car. Eventually, he falls out; she backs over him and leaves.

Cast
 Shaun Evans as Alex
 Scott Mechlowicz as Taylor
 Amelia Warner as Sophie
 Yvonne Strzechowski as Sondra
 Victoria Thaine as Lena
 Zoe Tuckwell-Smith as Ingrid

Production
The film was shot in several locations in New South Wales and Queensland, Australia. Outback scenes were filmed near the towns of Longreach and Winton on the extensive "black soil" plains of western Queensland.

Release

Box office
Gone grossed $88,748 at the Australian box office.

Critical reception
The film has a 54% approval rating on the review aggregator Rotten Tomatoes based on 13 reviews, with an average score of 5.65/10.

See also
 Cinema of Australia

References

External links
 
 Working Title Films: Gone

2007 films
2007 horror films
2007 psychological thriller films
British horror films
British psychological thriller films
Australian horror films
Australian thriller films
2007 directorial debut films
Films set in Sydney
Films shot in Sydney
StudioCanal films
Working Title Films films
2000s English-language films
2000s British films